Sistah Space is a London-based domestic violence charity that provides specialist services to women of African and Caribbean heritage.

History 
Sistah Space was founded by Ngozi Fulani in 2015, following the 2014 murder of Valerie Forde and her daughter. Sistah Space is "community-based nonprofit initiative created to bridge the gap in domestic abuse services for African heritage women and girls" Sistah Space operated out of a retail location on Lower Clapton, switching to accommodation on Mare Street, Hackney provided by Hackney Council in December 2019.

In 2020, the organisation complained about tweets sent by Philip Glanville. In the same year, the organisation entered into a dispute with Hackney Council over premises in Clapton supplied under a voluntary sector lease, which it claimed to be unsafe. Sistah Space subsequently changed locations. The following year, the organisation suggested sensitivity training for police to help them better support black women who have experienced domestic violence. In August 2022, they were denied permission to have their own float at the Hackney Carnival.

The charity attracted attention in November 2022 when its founder, Fulani, alleged that she had been subject to racist questioning by Lady Susan Hussey, a royal staff member, at a Buckingham Palace function.

In December 2022, the charity stopped much of its work and made a statement on Instagram that online abuse and safety concerns drove the decision. The same month, reporting stated that the Charity Commission and the Greater London Assembly were making preliminary investigations into the running of Sistah Space, following a series of more than 200 posts by an anonymous Twitter user questioning the charity's finances and organisation.

References 

2015 establishments in England
Organisations based in the London Borough of Hackney
Organizations established in 2015
Domestic violence-related organizations